Qiuga East Station is an underground metro station in Ningbo. Qiuga East Station is located near the Tiantongzhuang Depot of Line 1, Ningbo Rail Transit. Construction of the station started in May 2012, and service began on March 19, 2016.

Exits 
Qiuga East Station has two exits.

References 

Railway stations in Zhejiang
Railway stations in China opened in 2016
Ningbo Rail Transit stations